Typhinellus mirbatensis is a species of sea snail, a marine gastropod mollusk, in the family Muricidae, the murex snails or rock snails.

Description
The length of the shell attains 12 mm.

Distribution
This species occurs in Omani part of the Arabian Sea.

References

 Houart, R.; Gori, S. & Rosado, J. (2017). The Muricidae (Gastropoda: Muricoidea) from Oman with the description of four new species. Novapex. 18 (3): 41-69.

External links
  Houart R., Gori S. & Rosado J. (2015). Description of new species of Favartia (Pygmaepterys) and Typhinellus (Muricidae: Muricopsinae and Typhinae) from Southern Oman. Novapex. 16(4): 121-128

mirbatensis
Gastropods described in 2015